Atmakur is a village near the town of Sadasivapet, in the Medak District of the state of Telangana.

References

Villages in Medak district